Udvari is a Hungarian surname, an adjective of Udvar, a name of a village in Hungary. Notable people with the surname include:

Andreas Udvari (born 1981), German bobsledder 
Frank Udvari (1924–2014), Canadian ice hockey referee
Szabolcs Udvari (1974–2020), Hungarian footballer